Cuautlancingo Municipality is a town and municipality in Puebla, south-eastern Mexico. It is part of the Metropolitan area of Puebla. The town is bordered on the north by the state of Tlaxcala, Tlaxcala, east to the municipality of Tlaxcala and the city of  Puebla, to the south with the municipality of San Pedro Cholula and Puebla and west by the municipality of  Coronango. 

The Main Plant of Volkswagen de Mexico, Volkswagen's biggest plant in the world outside Germany, is located on the North of Cuautlancingo. It has a capacity of 2,500 units per day and employs around 14,000 people.

The Puebla City-area German school, Colegio Humboldt Puebla (Deutsche Schule Puebla), is in Cuautlancingo.

References

External links
 Cuautlancingo 

Municipalities of Puebla